Since their 1992 debut, the English rock band Radiohead have recorded more than 160 songs, most credited to the band as a whole. They have worked with producer Nigel Godrich since 1994. Several of their albums are consistently ranked among the greatest of all time.

Radiohead's first album, Pablo Honey (1993), preceded by their breakthrough single "Creep", features a sound reminiscent of alternative rock bands such as the Pixies and Nirvana. The Bends (1995) marked a move toward "anthemic rock", with more cryptic lyrics about social and global topics, and elements of Britpop. OK Computer (1997), the first Radiohead album produced by Godrich, features more abstract lyrics that reflected themes of modern alienation, and subtle, complex and textured songs.

Kid A (2000) and Amnesiac (2001), recorded in the same sessions, marked a drastic change in style, incorporating influences from electronic music, 20th-century classical music, krautrock and jazz. Radiohead's sixth album, Hail to the Thief (2003), combines electronic and rock music with lyrics written in response to the War on Terror. Radiohead self-released their seventh album, In Rainbows (2007), as a pay-what-you-want download. It incorporates alternative rock and art pop with more personal, "universal" lyrics. Outtakes from the album were released on In Rainbows Disk 2 (2007). In 2009, Radiohead released two non-album singles: "Harry Patch (In Memory Of)", a tribute to the last surviving World War I soldier Harry Patch, and "These Are My Twisted Words", a free download.

Radiohead's eighth album, The King of Limbs (2011), emphasises the rhythm section with extensive samples and loops. The band released four non-album singles in 2011: "Supercollider" and "The Butcher", followed by "The Daily Mail" and "Staircase". After a hiatus, Radiohead recorded a title song for the 2015 James Bond film Spectre, but it was rejected. Their next album, A Moon Shaped Pool (2016), incorporates art rock and ambient music, with string and choral arrangements performed by the London Contemporary Orchestra. In 2017, Radiohead released a deluxe remaster of OK Computer, OKNOTOK 1997 2017, including B-sides and the previously unreleased songs "I Promise", "Man of War", and "Lift". Kid A Mnesia, an anniversary reissue compiling Kid A, Amnesiac and previously unreleased material, was released on 5 November 2021.

Songs
All songs written by Thom Yorke, Jonny Greenwood, Colin Greenwood, Ed O'Brien and Philip Selway, except where noted.

Unreleased songs 
Radiohead have written numerous songs that have not been officially released. Live performances of many of the songs circulate as bootlegs. Asked in 2013 about the status of the unreleased songs, Radiohead's producer Nigel Godrich said he believed it would all "surface one day". He cited "Nude", written in the 1990s but released in 2007, as an example of a song that took years to complete.

See also 
 Radiohead discography
MiniDiscs [Hacked]

Notes

References

Bibliography

Radiohead
British music-related lists